Brian Yang (born 25 November 2001) is a Canadian badminton player. He was an integral part of the Team Alpha that won the mixed team relay gold at the 2018 Summer Youth Olympics.

Career

In 2016, he won three gold medals at the U–19 Pan Am Junior Championships, winning the boys' doubles, mixed doubles, and team events.

Yang won his first senior international title at 2017 Suriname International in the men's singles. In July, he won the boys' singles and mixed doubles titles at the Pan Am Junior Championships, while the Canada team captured the silver medal.

Yang represented Canada in the 2018 Commonwealth Games and Thomas Cup. At the El Salvador International, he won two titles in the men's singles and mixed doubles.

Yang clinched the men's singles title at the 2019 Canadian National Championships and became Canada's youngest national champion. He competed at the Sudirman Cup. Yang was named to Canada's 2019 Pan American Games team, ended up winning silver in the men's singles competition. He was crowned as the men's singles champion at the 2021 Pan Am Championships. He also won the gold medals in the boys' singles, doubles and mixed team at the Pan Am Junior Championships.

In June 2021, Yang was named to Canada's Olympic team for the 2020 Summer Olympics. He also competed at the first edition of the Junior Pan Am Games, clinching the gold medals in the boys' singles and mixed doubles.

In 2022, he won a silver medal at the Pan Am Championships, losing to Kevin Cordón in the final.

Achievements

Pan American Games 
Men's singles

Pan Am Championships 
Men's singles

Junior Pan American Games 
Boys' singles

Mixed doubles

Pan Am Junior Championships 
Boys' singles

Boys' doubles

Mixed doubles

BWF International Challenge/Series (8 titles, 4 runners-up)
Men's singles

Mixed doubles

  BWF International Challenge tournament
  BWF International Series tournament
  BWF Future Series tournament

References

External links 

 

2001 births
Living people
Sportspeople from Toronto
Canadian sportspeople of Chinese descent
Canadian male badminton players
Badminton players at the 2018 Summer Youth Olympics
Badminton players at the 2020 Summer Olympics
Olympic badminton players of Canada
Badminton players at the 2018 Commonwealth Games
Badminton players at the 2022 Commonwealth Games
Commonwealth Games competitors for Canada
Badminton players at the 2019 Pan American Games
Pan American Games silver medalists for Canada
Pan American Games medalists in badminton
Medalists at the 2019 Pan American Games
Medalists at the 2018 Summer Youth Olympics
21st-century Canadian people